Morten Christoffer Jensen (born 9 March 1980) is a Norwegian football coach and former player. He is currently head coach of Eliteserien club Viking FK.

Jensen played youth football at Havørn, Vidar and Viking, before starting his senior career with Vidar. After a couple of years at the club, he joined the Dowling Golden Lions in 2003. He stayed in the US for four years, and then he returned to Norway to join Stavanger IF in 2007. He later had another spell at Vidar and a spell at Brodd, before becoming player-coach of his youth club Havørn. Ahead of the 2017 season, he became head coach of Vidar, and from 2018 to 2020 he was an assistant coach at Viking.

Playing career
Jensen started playing football for Tananger-based side Havørn, before transferring to Stavanger-based side Vidar in 1992. In 1998, he tried his luck at Tippeligaen club Viking FK, but a groin injury hindered his development, and kept him on the sideline for one and a half years.

After his unsuccessful spell at Viking, Jensen returned to Vidar to play first team football. He spent most of his playing career playing for local clubs in the lower divisions in Norway, but he also played college soccer in the US for the Dowling Golden Lions, where he had a very successful period. He joined the club in 2003. In the 2004 season, Jensen scored 27 goals and made 16 assists in 19 matches. In 2006, the Dowling Golden Lions won the NCAA Division II Men's Soccer Championship, and Jensen scored the game-winning goal in the final. He finished the 2006 season with 24 goals and 10 assists, and was awarded NSCAA Division II National Player of the Year. 

In August 2007, he returned to Norway, signing for 2. divisjon club Stavanger IF. He later played for Vidar and Brodd.

Managerial career

Havørn and Vidar
Jensen became player-coach of 5. divisjon club Havørn ahead of the 2013 season. The club earned promotion in his first season. He stayed at the club for three more seasons, before being appointed head coach of 2. divisjon club Vidar on 8 December 2016. He stayed at Vidar for one season, a season where Vidar finished in 4th place in group 2 of the 2017 2. divisjon.

Viking
On 19 December 2017, he became assistant coach under Bjarne Berntsen at newly relegated Eliteserien club Viking FK. He served as an assistant coach for three seasons, in which the club earned promotion to the top division in 2018, and won the Norwegian Football Cup in 2019. On 26 November 2020, it was announced that head coach Bjarne Berntsen would leave Viking after the 2020 season. Simultaneously, it was announced that Jensen and Bjarte Lunde Aarsheim would replace Berntsen, taking over as joint head coaches on two-year contracts. Like Jensen, Lunde Aarsheim was also an assistant coach at the club before being appointed head coach. They took charge ahead of the 2021 season. Viking finished the 2021 season in third place, and on 25 March 2022, the head coaches' contracts were extended until the end of the 2025 season.

Honours
Dowling Golden Lions
NCAA Division II Men's Soccer Championship: 2006 

Individual
NSCAA Division II National Player of the Year: 2006

References

1980 births
Living people
Norwegian footballers
Association football forwards
Norwegian expatriate footballers
Norwegian expatriate sportspeople in the United States
Expatriate soccer players in the United States
College men's soccer players in the United States
Dowling College alumni
FK Vidar players
Stavanger IF players
IL Brodd players
Norwegian Second Division players
Norwegian Third Division players
Norwegian Fourth Division players
Viking FK non-playing staff
Norwegian football managers
FK Vidar managers
Viking FK managers
Eliteserien managers